Collaroy, an electoral district of the Legislative Assembly in the Australian state of New South Wales was created in 1950 and abolished in 1973.


Election results

Elections in the 1970s

1971

Elections in the 1960s

1968

1965

1962

Elections in the 1950s

1959

1956

1953

1950

References

New South Wales state electoral results by district